North Coast is a major division/area in Saint John Parish, Antigua and Barbuda.

It is home to 5.56% of Antigua and Barbuda's population, it also has the highest living condition index of any major division area having one of 19.59.

Demographics 
The Major Division code for North Coast is 31.

North Coast has twelve enumeration districts.

 31000 Marble Hill
 31100 Trade Winds 
 31200 Paradise View 
 31300 McKinnon’s
 31401 McKinnon’s-S.P._1
 31402 McKinnon’s-S.P._2
 31500 Adelin
 31600 Prison Farm
 31701 Cedar Valley-Longford
 31702 Cedar Valley
 31800 Piggott's Ville-Woods 
 31900 Upper Clare Hall

References 

Saint John Parish, Antigua and Barbuda
Major Divisions of Antigua and Barbuda